Unnukka is a medium-sized lake in Southern Savonia region in Finland with dozens of big and little islands. It belongs to Vuoksi main catchment area. Unnukka's elevation is almost the same as the lake Savivesi´s elevation, and it is possible to see them as one lake.

See also
List of lakes in Finland

References

Lakes of Leppävirta